Ashi Kesang Choden (born 21 May 1930) is the Queen Grandmother of Bhutan and the widow of the late Jigme Dorji Wangchuck. She participates in royal duties of her own accord. She is the only queen grandmother in the world. In Bhutan she is called The Royal Grandmother.

Education
She was educated at the St Joseph's Convent, Kalimpong, India, as well as the House of Citizenship, London.

In her reminiscence, the Queen notes:

Marriage and family
She married Crown Prince of Bhutan (Druk Gyalsey), Jigme Dorji Wangchuck, at the Ugyen Pelri Thang Palace, Paro, on 5 October 1951.

She became Queen consort of Bhutan in 1952 when her husband, King Jigme Dorji Wangchuck, ascended to the throne upon the death of his father. In 1953 she was expecting her first child, a daughter. Her first daughter arrived earlier than she expected as she was waiting for a Western doctor and her mother to travel to Thimphu to help with the delivery. The previous Queen, Ashi Phuntsho Choden, her maid, and the Bhutanese doctor Phenchun helped to deliver her daughter.

Her children with the Third Druk Gyalpo were:

 Princess (Druk Gyalsem) Sonam Choden Wangchuck (born 1953).
 Princess (Druk Gyalsem) Dechen Wangmo Wangchuck (born 1954).
 King (Druk Gyalpo) Jigme Singye Wangchuck (born 1955).
 Princess (Druk Gyalsem) Pema Lhaden Wangchuck (born 1959).
 Princess (Druk Gyalsem) Kesang Wangmo Wangchuck (born 1961).

Royal duties
In 1972, she was appointed regent when her husband was ill. She has also been a patron of annual prayers conducted for the well-being and security of the King, country, and the people. She provides subsistence allowance to about 200 monks and tshampas (lay monks) in various monasteries in Bumthang, Dokar Phurdrub Gompa and Euto Gompa in Paro, Nyala Gompa in Trongsa and Jangsa Gompa in Kalimpong, India. She also has a keen interest in preserving the unique art, architecture and cultural heritage of Bhutan and in promoting research and scholarship on the kingdom. She often visits religious places in Bhutan and India.

In commemoration of the Royal Grandmother's 87th birth anniversary, a book titled "The Heart of a Sacred Kingdom, Her Majesty the Royal Grandmother Ashi Kesang Choden Wangchuck: A Lifetime of Service to the People and Kingdom of Bhutan" was published on Sunday 21 May 2017.

Ancestry

References

Notes 

1930 births
Living people
Bhutanese monarchy
Dorji family
Wangchuck dynasty
Queen mothers